USS LST-607 was a United States Navy LST-542-class tank landing ship in commission from 1944 to 1946. She later served in a non-commissioned status in the Military Sea Transportation Service as USNS LST-607 (T-LST-607).

Construction and commissioning
LST-607 was laid down on 2 December 1943 at Seneca Illinois, by the Chicago Bridge and Iron Company. She was launched on 7 April 1944, sponsored by Mrs. John Pirok;, and commissioned on 24 April 1944.

World War II service
During World War II, LST-607 was assigned to the Pacific Theater of Operations and participated in the capture and occupation of the southern Palau Islands in September and October 1944.

Following the war, LST-607 performed occupation duty in the Far East until early January 1946. She was decommissioned on 11 January 1946.

Later career
On 31 March 1952, LST-607 was transferred to the Military Sea Transportation Service, in which she served as USNS LST-607 (T-LST-607).

USNS LST-607 was transferred to the Philippine Navy on 13 September 1976.  Her later fate is unknown.

Awards and honors
LST-607 earned one battle star for World War II service.

Media Appearance
 This ship made a brief(at approximately 59:24) appearance in a scene from the 1977 biographical movie MacArthur (film).

References

External links 
  history.navy.mil: USS LST-607
  navsource.org: USS LST-607

LST-542-class tank landing ships
World War II amphibious warfare vessels of the United States
Cold War amphibious warfare vessels of the United States
Ships transferred from the United States Navy to the Philippine Navy
Ships built in Seneca, Illinois
1944 ships